Contenson may refer to:
Vincent Contenson
tenso, an Occitan literary genre